Paulina National Forest was established by the U.S. Forest Service in Oregon on July 1, 1911, with  from portions of Cascade, Crater, Deschutes, Fremont and Umpqua National Forests .  On July 19, 1915, portions of Paulina were transferred back to Crater, Deschutes and Fremont, and the remainder was eliminated. They are now part of Rogue River-Siskiyou National Forest.

References

External links
Forest History Society
Forest History Society:Listing of the National Forests of the United States Text from Davis, Richard C., ed. Encyclopedia of American Forest and Conservation History. New York: Macmillan Publishing Company for the Forest History Society, 1983. Vol. II, pp. 743-788.

Former National Forests of Oregon
Rogue River-Siskiyou National Forest
1911 establishments in Oregon
Protected areas established in 1911
1915 disestablishments in Oregon